Neaspilota albidipennis is a species of tephritid or fruit flies in the genus Neaspilota of the family Tephritidae.

Distribution
United States.

References

Tephritinae
Insects described in 1861
Diptera of North America